Al-Ahdal is an Arabic surname. Notable people with the surname include:

Abdullah al-Ahdal (died 1989), Belgian Imam
Mohammed Hamdi al-Ahdal (born 1971), Saudi Al-Qaeda member
Wajdi al-Ahdal (born 1973), Yemeni writer and playwright

Arabic-language surnames